The following lists events that happened during 1807 in Australia.

Incumbents
Monarch - George III

Governors
Governors of the Australian colonies:
Governor of New South Wales – Captain William Bligh
Lieutenant-Governor of Southern Van Diemen's Land – David Collins
Lieutenant-Governor of Northern Van Diemen's Land – William Paterson

Events
23 August – The first dry cleaning business opened in Sydney by Englishman Robert Davidson.

Exploration and settlement
8 February – Lieutenant Thomas Laycock explores Van Diemen's Land, finding the Clyde River

References

 
Australia
Years of the 19th century in Australia